The Berber Arabic alphabet (in berber :   or  or Agemmay amaziɣ aεrab, in french : Abjad berbèro-arabe, in arabic ) is an Arabic-based alphabet that was used to write various Berber languages in the Middle Ages. Nowadays users have largely reverted to either the Tifinagh alphabet in Morocco, 
or Berber Latin alphabet in Algeria.

References

Bibliography 
 

Berber languages
Arabic alphabets
Writing systems of Africa